Glaucomastix cyanura is a species of teiid lizard endemic to Brazil.

References

Glaucomastix
Reptiles of Brazil
Endemic fauna of Brazil
Reptiles described in 2011
Taxa named by Federico José Arias
Taxa named by Celso Morato de Carvalho
Taxa named by Miguel Trefaut Rodrigues
Taxa named by Hussam Zaher